This is a list of commercial banks in Eritrea

 Bank of Eritrea
Commercial Bank of Eritrea
Eritrean Investment and Development Bank
Housing and Commerce Bank

See also

 Banking in Eritrea
 List of banks in Africa
 List of companies based in Eritrea

References

 
Banks
Eritrea
Eritrea